The 6th constituency of Meurthe-et-Moselle is a French legislative constituency in the Meurthe-et-Moselle département.

Description

Meurthe-et-Moselle's 6th constituency stretches from the north of Nancy through the centre of the department roughly following the course of the river Moselle. It includes the towns of Pompey and Pont-à-Mousson.

From 1988 to 2017 the seat was held by Jean-Yves Le Déaut of the Socialist Party.

Historic Representation

Election results

2022 

 
 
|-
| colspan="8" bgcolor="#E9E9E9"|
|-
 

 
 
 
 

* Dissident LREM candidate, not supported by Ensemble Citoyens alliance.

2017

2012

 
 
 
 
 
|-
| colspan="8" bgcolor="#E9E9E9"|
|-

Sources
Official results of French elections from 2002: "Résultats électoraux officiels en France" (in French).

6